Levi Cutter (May 22, 1774 – March 2, 1856) was an American businessperson and politician from Maine. Cutter served as the fourth Mayor of Portland from 1834 to 1840.

Cutter was born and raised in North Yarmouth, Maine, where he lived until 1803 when he moved to Portland. In September 1796, Cutter married Lucretia Mitchell. The couple were married until Mitchell's death in 1827 and had ten children. He married again in 1833 to Ruth (Kendall) Jenkins, who died in 1862. Jenkins and Cutter had no children.

References

1774 births
1856 deaths
Businesspeople from Maine
People from North Yarmouth, Maine
Mayors of Portland, Maine